"Love on a Two-Way Street" is a soul ballad written by Sylvia Robinson, Lezli Valentine and Bert Keyes in 1968. The song was originally recorded by Lezli Valentine, an artist signed to All Platinum, the record label that Sylvia Robinson co-owned with her husband, Joe. The song was then recorded by The Moments, an R&B vocal group signed to All Platinum subsidiary Stang Records, as filler for their 1968 album Not on the Outside, But on the Inside, Strong!. Sylvia and Joe decided to release the song as a single in March 1970 and it went on to become one of the biggest R&B hits of that year, spending five weeks at number one on Billboard's Soul Singles chart and reaching number three on the Hot 100 chart. Billboard ranked the record as the No. 25 song of 1970. It was also certified gold by the RIAA for sales of one million copies.

Musical composition
Willie and The Mighty Magnificents provided most of the musical backing on the song and Bert Keyes created the string arrangement that was overdubbed onto the track while also playing piano on the recording session.

According to the song's original vocalist, Lezli Valentine, she was a third contributor to the song, writing most of the song's lyrics:

Chart history

Weekly charts

Year-end charts

Sampling
The Moments' version of the song has been sampled by The AB's formally known as Asamov in 2005 for the song "Supa Dynamite", by Caribou in the track "Subotnick" from 2005's The Milk of Human Kindness, and by Jay-Z and Alicia Keys' single "Empire State of Mind" in 2009.

Stacy Lattisaw version

In 1981, 14-year-old artist Stacy Lattisaw covered "Love on a Two-Way Street." It was the lead single from her With You LP.  The song peaked at number two R&B, number 19 Adult Contemporary, and number 26 on the Hot 100.  This version also peaked at number 23 on the Cash Box Top 100 during August of that year.  The song was her second U.S. Top 40 hit.

Charts

Other cover versions
The song was also covered by Grant Green on his 1971 album, Visions.
Gloria Estefan included her version on her 1994 album, Hold Me, Thrill Me, Kiss Me.
Brenda K. Starr covered the song on her album, Temptation'' (2002).
The song was also covered by Boz Scaggs on his 2013 album, Memphis.

References

External links
Lyrics of this song

Soul-patrol.com

1968 songs
1970 singles
1981 singles
2002 songs
Songs written by Sylvia Robinson
Stacy Lattisaw songs
The Moments songs
Brenda K. Starr songs
Cotillion Records singles